Héctor Simón Escudero (born 13 March 1984) is a Spanish professional footballer who plays for UE Olot as an attacking midfielder.

Club career
Born in Llançà, Girona, Catalonia, after starting out at local UE Figueres, Simón finished his formation also in his native region, at RCD Espanyol. In the 2003–04 season he made his first-team debuts, playing eight times – mainly as a late substitute – as the club could barely avoid relegation, finishing 16th; his first La Liga match came on 30 August 2003, when he played the last minute of a 1–1 home draw against Real Sociedad.

Simón then had an unassuming loan spell at Racing de Ferrol, appearing sparingly in an eventual relegation from the second division and being finally released by Espanyol in the 2008 summer without any further main squad appearances. He subsequently signed with neighbouring Girona FC in the second level, featuring rarely for the club over the course of two seasons.

In January 2009, Simón served a five-month loan in division three, with Cultural y Deportiva Leonesa. In the same month of the following year he was released by Girona, signing for Benidorm CF; he played the entire 2010–11 with yet another side in the category, CD Castellón.

References

External links

1984 births
Living people
People from Alt Empordà
Sportspeople from the Province of Girona
Spanish footballers
Footballers from Catalonia
Association football midfielders
La Liga players
Segunda División players
Segunda División B players
RCD Espanyol B footballers
RCD Espanyol footballers
Racing de Ferrol footballers
Girona FC players
Cultural Leonesa footballers
Benidorm CF footballers
CD Castellón footballers
CE Sabadell FC footballers
Real Oviedo players
UE Olot players
Spain youth international footballers